When referring to Roman Catholic religious orders, the term Second Order refers to those Orders of cloistered nuns which are a part of the mendicant Orders that developed in the Middle Ages.

History

Dominican
In early 13th century, St. Dominic Guzman was a canon regular at the Cathedral of Osma in Spain. He accompanied his bishop on a trip to Denmark to arrange a marriage between the son of the King of Castile and a member of the Danish royal family. On the return trip, Dominic encountered the followers of the Duke of Albi in southern France. The Duke was a leading Cathar, which embraced a gnostic form of Christianity. Dominic undertook a preaching campaign to them, in order to bring them back to an orthodox understanding of the faith. Several women who responded to his preaching sought a completely new direction in their lives. In response to this, Dominic established a house for them in Prouille in 1206, where they could lead lives of prayer and penance.

In 1880, four nuns of the Dominican Sisters of Perpetual Adoration from the Monastery of the Blessed Sacrament in Oullins, France arrived in the Diocese of Newark, at the invitation of Bishop Michael Corrigan. By 1884, the Monastery of St. Dominic had been constructed based on Old World designs with an arched cloister, the traditional well, the vault resting-place of the departed, and the double grills separating them from the outer world. By 1889, Corrigan had become Archbishop of New York, and seven nuns from Newark re-located temporarily to establish Corpus Christi Monastery in Hunt's Point in the Bronx.   

Today the Second Order of St. Dominic "...consists of cloistered nuns who take solemn vows of poverty, chastity, and obedience and dedicate themselves to a life of silence, prayer, and penance." They support themselves through intellectual, manual, and artistic work.

Franciscan
St. Francis of Assisi began his life of preaching and penance in the Tuscan region of Italy around this same time. His preaching drew a young noblewoman of the city, the Lady Clare to be inspired to follow his way of life. Determined to take this step, Clare snuck out of her family's palace to join Francis and his brothers on the night of Palm Sunday 1211. After receiving her commitment and giving her the Franciscan habit, Francis then entrusted Clare to the care of a nearby community of Benedictine nuns for her training in monastic life. The Order that emerged from her commitment, originally called the "Poor Ladies of Assisi" and now known as the Poor Clares, took a form of monastic life committed to a strict life of poverty. The order includes many different monasteries of cloistered nuns professing the Rule of St. Clare.

Later groups
As the various other groups of mendicant friars came into being, such as the Carmelites, Servites and Minims, they were accompanied by female branches which followed a monastic way of life. Groups of the laity were also incorporated into the movements. These later groups came to be called Third Orders. By comparison, the monastic women's Orders came to be called the "Second" Orders.

See also
Dominican Order
Discalced Carmelites
Augustinian nuns
Servites
Minims
Mendicant Orders

References

Catholic orders and societies by type
Christian religious orders established in the 13th century
Catholicism in the Middle Ages
History of Catholic religious orders
History of Catholic monasticism